Jens Berendt Jensen (born 21 February 1940) is a Danish rower. He competed at the 1960 Summer Olympics and the 1964 Summer Olympics.

References

External links
 

1940 births
Living people
Danish male rowers
Olympic rowers of Denmark
Rowers at the 1960 Summer Olympics
Rowers at the 1964 Summer Olympics
People from Faxe Municipality
Sportspeople from Region Zealand